Gabriel Udişteanu (20 February 1945 – 1992) was a Romanian volleyball player. He competed in the men's tournament at the 1972 Summer Olympics.

References

1945 births
1992 deaths
Romanian men's volleyball players
Olympic volleyball players of Romania
Volleyball players at the 1972 Summer Olympics
Sportspeople from Arad, Romania